Behind Enemy Lines is a role-playing game published by FASA in 1982.

Description
Behind Enemy Lines is a military system covering U.S. soldiers on the Western Front in World War II. Skill and combat rules are fairly simple, as they are descended from the original Traveller systems. In the first edition, the "Character Generation and Basic Rules" book (96 pages) covers character creation, combat, maps, interrogation, and special units. The "Event Tables" book (48 pages) is full of randomized tables for covering almost any kind of situation: encounters in woods, towns, and fortifications; on railroads; for parachuting and mountain climbing; etc. The "Missions" book (56 pages) has three scenarios, four miniscenarios, and numerous "pregenerated" NPCs. In the second edition, all this material is reorganized into a "Soldier's Handbook" (32 pages), a "Commander's Manual" (32 pages), an "Operations Book" (16 pages), and an Infantry Reference Data sheet.

Publication history
Behind Enemy Lines was designed by William H. Keith, Jr., with Jordan Weisman, Ross Babcock, Eric Turn, and Steve Turn, and was published in 1982 by FASA as a boxed set including a 96-page book, a 56-page book, and a 48-page book, a map booklet, four cardstock sheets, two cardboard counter sheets, and dice. The second edition was published by FASA in 1985 as a boxed set including two 32-page books, and a 16-page book, a cardstock screen, and dice.

Behind Enemy Lines was the first role-playing game set in the 1940s.

Reception
The first edition set of Behind Enemy Lines was an H.G. Wells award-winner.

Behind Enemy Lines was awarded the Origins Award for "Best Roleplaying Rules of 1982".

Reviews
Different Worlds (Issue 35 - Jul 1984)
 Casus Belli #15 (June 1983)

References

FASA games
Historical role-playing games
Military role-playing games
Origins Award winners
Role-playing games introduced in 1982